Spellemannprisen, often referred to as the Norwegian Grammy Awards in English, is a Norwegian music award presented to Norwegian musicians. The award was established by the International Federation of the Phonographic Industry (IFPI), an organization that represents the interests of the recording industry worldwide. First awarded in 1973, the prize honours musicians from the previous year; it is still awarded annually, usually in January or February. The Spellemann committee, composed of members of IFPI Norway and FONO, manages the award and acts as the judge. 21 categories are currently awarded, in addition to other honorary and industry awards the committee may give. In 2020 and 2021, the award show was held digitally due to the COVID-19 pandemic.

Juries and scoring
Separate juries convene for each category. Members are confidential from both the general public and the other juries. The juries score each nominee separately, then convene to deliberate until there is a winner. Usually, three nominees are presented to the jury.

The Spellemanns committee nominates three categories: Newcomer of the Year, Fiddler of the Year and Hit Artist. A nomination jury nominates the rest of the videos, which are then presented to the juries.

Newcomer Award
Starting in 2007, the winner of the Newcomer of the Year Award takes home a prize of 200 000 kroner. The scholarship is awarded by Gramo, a Norwegian music industry funding agency.

Multiple award winners
As of 2014, sixteen artists have won the prize more than five times. Leif Ove Andsnes has the most wins with 10 awards.

Broadcast channels
In 2011, the live award show returned to NRK for the first time since 2001, and remained on the same channel afterwards. From 2002 to 2010, the show was broadcast on TV 2.

Awards by year

1972

1973

1974

1975

1976

1977

1978

1979

1980

1981

1982

1983

1984

1985

1986

1987

1988

1989

1990

1991

1992

1993

1994

1995

1996

1997

1998

1999

2000

2001

2002

2003

2004

2005

2006

2007

2008

2009

2010

2011

2012

2013

2014

2015

2016

2017

2018
Nominees and winners:

Children's music
 Karoline Krüger og Fru Nitters Rytmeorkester: Labyrinter!
 Naboen Min: Rockesock (Winner)
 Tonje Unstad: Musling med melk
 Mandarinsaft: På vei te en venn

Blues
 Ulf Myrvold: Old Memories
 Geir Bertheussen Blues Express: Southside
 JT Lauritsen & The Buckshot Hunters: Blue Eyed Soul Volume 1
 Jørgen Sandvik: Permanent Vacation (Winner)

Country
 Hege Øversveen: Goodbye Yellow Roses
 Country Heroes: Honky Tonk Tears
 Malin Pettersen: References Pt. 1 (Winner)
 The Northern Belle: Blinding Blue Neon

Electronica
 Fakethias: Attune
 Sex Judas feat. Ricky: Go Down Judas (Winner)
 Bjørn Torske: Byen
 Smerz: Have Fun

Folk/traditional music
 Aslak Brimi Kvartett: Vev
 Johanne Flottorp: Johanne Flottorp
 Sudan Dudan: Heimen der ute
 Marja Mortensson: Mojhtestasse – Cultural Heirlooms (Winner)

Indie/alternative
 Okay Kaya: Both
 Thea Hjelmeland: Kulla (Winner)
 Boy Pablo: Soy Pablo
 Fay Wildhagen: Borders

Jazz
 Gurls: Run boy, run (Winner)
 Moskus: Mirakler
 Atomic: Pet Variations
 Hanna Paulsberg Concept + Magnus Broo: Daughter Of The Sun

Classical
 Frida Fredrikke Waaler Wærvågen & Ingrid Andsnes: Metamorfose
 Tora Augestad & Oslo Philharmonic Orchestra: Portraying Passion (Winner)
 Christian Ihle Hadland: Christian Ihle Hadland plays Domenico Scarlatti
 Stavanger Symfoniorkester: Symphonic Dances

Metal
 Aura Noir: Aura Noire
 : Cenotaph Obscure (Winner)
 Beaten To Death: Agronomicon
 Sylvaine: Atoms Aligned, Coming Undone

Pop artist
 Sigrid: Raw EP
 Sondre Justad: Ingenting i paradis
 Amanda Delara: Running Deep + Soldiers
 Emilie Nicolas: Tranquille Emile (Winner)

Pop group
 Band of Gold: Where’s The Magic (Winner)
 Razika: Sånn kjennes verden ut
 Lemaitre: Lemaitre 2018
 Seeb: Nice To Meet You

Rock
 Oslo Ess: Frie radikaler
 The Good The Bad and The Zugly: Misanthropical House (Winner)
 Årabrot: Who Do You Love
 Turbonegro: Rock’n’roll Machine

Contemporary
 Kjell Tore Innervik: UTOPIAS — Radical Interpretations of Iconic Musical Works for Percussion
 Telemark kammerorkester, dirigent Lars-Erik ter Jung: Chasing Strings
 Oslo Philharmonic Orchestra: Ørjan Matre: Konsert for orkester
 Cikada strykekvartett / Knut Olaf Sunde: Vertigo Room

Urban
 MARS: MARS
 EMIR: Mer av deg (Winner)
 Lil Halima: Lil Halima 2018
 Unge Beirut: Hevnen er søt, men jeg tilgir deg

Viser (Vispop)
 Ingeborg Oktober: Skjømmingsboka (Winner)
 Ellen Sofie Hovland: Og solen renner over
 Erik Lukashaugen: Vi eier skogene
 Masåva: Masåva

Open class
 Anja Garbarek: The Road Is Just A Surface
 Geir Sundstøl: Brødløs (Winner)
 Harpreet Bansal: Samaya
 Amgala Temple: Invisible Airships

Tonos composer prize
 Anja Garbarek: The Road Is Just A Surface
 Geir Holmsen: Et stille sted
 Oslo Philharmonic Orchestra – Ørjan Matre: Konsert for orkester (Winner)
 Arve Henriksen/Eivind Aarset/Jan Bang/Jez riley French: The Height Of The Reeds

Songwriter
 Stig Joar Haugen: Midt Imellom Magisk Og Manisk
 Dagny Norvoll Sandvik: Dagny Låtskriver 2018
 Ina Wroldsen: Hex (Winner)
 Thea Hjelmeland: Kulla

Music video
 Aurora / director: Kinga Burza: "Queendom"
 Hkeem / director: Thor Brenne: "Ghettoparasitt" (Winner)
 Sigrid / director: AB/CD/CD: "Sucker Punch"
 Sondre Justad / director: Trond Kvig Andreassen: "Ikke som de andre"

Producer
 Aksel Carlson: For example MARS, Emilie Nicolas, Arif & Unge Ferrari (Winner)
 Fay Wildhagen: Borders
 Kai Gundelach: Baltus
 Kåre Christoffer Vestrheim: For example Anja Garbarek, Emilie Nicolas, Håkon Kornstad, Batagraf

Lyricist 
 Eduardo Andersen: La oss ta en idealist (Winner)
 Lars Saabye Christensen: Et stille sted
 Ina Wroldsen: Hex
 Odd Nordstoga: Kløyvd

Album of the year
 Emilie Nicolas: Tranquille Emilie (Winner)
 Rotlaus: På vei
 Sondre Justad: Ingenting i paradis
 Unge Ferrari: Midt Imellom Magisk Og Manisk

Breakthrough of the year & Gramo scholarship
 Boy Pablo (Winner)
 Lise Davidsen
 Kamelen
 Rotlaus
 Ruben

Song
 Alan Walker feat. Tomine Harket, Au/Ra: "Darkside"
 Astrid S: "Emotion"
 Ina Wroldsen: "Strongest"
 K-391 feat. Alan Walker, Julie Bergan, Seungri: "Ignite"
 Kygo, Miguel: "Remind Me to Forget"
 Mads Hansen: "Sommerkroppen" (Winner)
 Ruben: "Walls"
 Seeb, Dagny: "Drink About"
 Sigrid: "Strangers"
 Sondre Justad: "Ikke som de andre"

Årets hederspris (Honorary Award of the year)
 DDE (Selected)

Årets Spellemann (Spellemann of the year)
 Alan Walker (Selected)

2019
Nominees and winners:

Barnemusikk (Children's music)
 Even Jenssen: Over byen
 Maria Solheim and Silje Sirnes Winje: Bråkebøttebaluba (Winner)
 Mr. E & Me:  New Orchestral Hits 4 Kids (with Kringkastingsorkesteret)
 Så rart!: På havets bunn

Blues
 Busk, Eriksen, Sjøstrøm (Back Porch Republic): Hustle & Flow
 Håkon Høye: Nights at the Surf Motel
 Ledfoot: White Crow (Winner)
 Viktor Wilhelmsen: Knip igjen øyan

Country
 Jonas Fjeld & Judy Collins: Winterstories (with Chatham County Line)
 Jørund Vålandsmyr & Menigheten: Til dere som er lykkelige (Winner)
 Signe Marie Rustad: When Words Flew Freely
 Unnveig Aas: Young Heart

Electronica
 André Bratten: Pax Americana (Winner)
 Carmen Villain: Both Lines Will Be Blue
 Chmmr: Try New Things
 Prins Thomas: Ambitions

Folk/traditional music
 Hans Fredrik Jacobsen: Øre
 Helga Myhr: Natten veller seg ut
 Moenje: Klarvær
 Morgonrode: Morgonrode (Winner)

Indie/alternative
 Kongle: Skogen
 Konradsen: Saints and Sebastian Stories (Winner)
 Pom Poko: Birthday
 Tuvaband: I Entered the Void

Jazz
 Elephant9: Psychedelic Backfire I
 Gard Nilssen's Acoustic Unity: To Whom Who Buys a Record
 Maria Kannegaard: Nådeslås
 Mats Eilertsen Trio: And Then Comes the Night (Winner)

Classical
 Eldbjørg Hemsing: Tan Dun: Fire Ritual
 Lise Davidsen: Richard Strauss: Four Last Songs / Wagner: Arias from Tannhäuser
 Oslo filharmoniske orkester: Mahler Symphony No. 3 (Winner)
 Vilde Frang: Paganini & Schubert: Works for violin & piano

Metal
 Gaahls Wyrd - GastiR - Ghosts invited (Winner)
 Kampfar: Ofidians Manifest
 Sâver: They Came With Sunlight
 Sibiir: Rope

Pop artist
 Bendik: Det går bra
 Gabrielle: Snart, Gabby
 Ruben: Melancholic
 Sigrid: Sucker Punch (Winner)

Pop group
 Fieh: Cold Water Burning Skin
 Highasakite: Uranium Heart
 No. 4: Duell
 Seeb: Seeb 2019 (Winner)

Rock
 Backstreet Girls: Normal is Dangerous
 brenn.: Elsker (Winner)
 Erlend Ropstad: Brenn siste brevet
 Spielbergs: This Is Not The End

Contemporary
 Cikada, Lars Petter Hagen: Hagen: Harmonium Repertoire
 Peter Herresthal, Oslo filharmoniske orkester, Clémént Mao-Takacs: Kaija Saariaho: Graal théâtre - Circle Map - Neiges - Vers toi qui es si loin
 Øyvind Torvund, BIT20 Ensemble, Trond Madsen, Kjetil Møster & Jørgen Træen: The Exotica Album (Winner)
 Hvoslef Chambermusic Project: Hvoslef Chamber Works No. VI

Urban
 Dutty Dior: Para / Normal
 Isah: Sukkerspinn & Hodepine (Winner)
 Karpe: Sas Plus/Sas Pussy
 Lil Halima: Lil Halima 2019

Viser (Vispop)
 Asbjørn Ribe: Blått & grønt & gult
 Benny Borg: En dag på jorden
 Frida Ånnevik: Andre sanger (Winner)
 Hekla Stålstrenga: Elske og ære

Open class
 Deathprod: Occulting Disk
 Erlend Apneseth trio: Salika, Molika (Winner)
 Ståle Storløkken: The Haze Of Sleeplessness
 Susanna & the Brotherhood of Our Lady: Garden of Earthly Delights

Album
 Arif: Arif i Waanderland
 Gabrielle: Snart, Gabby
 Karpe: Sas Plus/Sas Pussy (Winner)
 Sigrid: Sucker Punch

Breakthrough of the year & Gramo scholarship
 Bokassa
 brenn.
 
 Girl in Red
 Isah (Winner)
 Pom Poko

Tonos composer prize
 Eirik Hegdal: Musical Balloon
 Helge Iberg: Helge Iberg: Songs from the Planet of Life (Winner)
 Maja S.K. Ratkje: Sult
 Cecilie Ore: Come to the Edge!

Song
 Arif: "Hvem er hun"
 Isah/Dutty Dior: "Hallo"
 KEiiNO: "Spirit in the Sky"
 Kygo feat. Store P, Lars Vaular: "Kem kan eg ringe"
 Nicolay Ramm: "Raske Briller"
 Rat City feat. Isak Heim: "Kind Of Love"
 Ruben: "Lay By Me" (Winner)
 Sigrid: "Don't Feel Like Crying"

Songwriter 
 Gabrielle Leithaug (Gabrielle): Snart, Gabby
 Magdi Omar Ytreeide Abdelmaguid and Chirag Rashmikant Patel (Karpe): Sas Plus/Sas Pussy
 Lars Reiersen (Larsiveli): Larsiveli 2019 (Winner)
 Sigrid Solbakk Raabe (Sigrid): Sucker Punch

Music video
 Anna of the North (director: Noah Lee: "Leaning On Myself" (Winner)
 Bigbang (director: Lasse Gretland): "Bells"
 Boy Pablo (director: Julian Vargas, Bjarne Anmarkrud and Harry Hambley: "Feeling Lonely"
 Lars Vaular (director: onzonz): "Kroppsspråk"

Producer
 Aksel Carlson: Aksel Carlson
 Cashmere Cat: Cashmere 2019
 Martin Sjølie: Martin Sjølie (Winner)
 Morten Gillebo: Morten Gillebo

Lyricist
 Arif Salum: Arif i Waanderland
 Frida Ånnevik: Andre sanger
 Emilie Stoesen Christensen (No. 4): Duell
 Signe Marie Rustad: When Words Flew Freely (Winner)

Honorary Award
 Oslo-Filharmonien (Selected)

Spellemann 
 Sigrid Solbakk Raabe (Selected)

2020
Nominees:

Children's music
 hei kalas: hvorfor er jeg allergisk?
 Aslak Brimi and Mari Midtli: Huldra Hildur
 Sarah Camille: Spor av dråper og røde nebb
 Andreas Ihlebæk: Northern Lullabies

Blues
 The Bills: Til The Blues Have Gone
 Daniel Eriksen: Barefoot Among Scarecrows
 Knut Reiersrud: Ballads and Blues from the 20's Vol. 1
 TORA: Girls

Country
 Sweetheart: Sweetheart
 Malin Pettersen: Wildhorse
 Darling West: We'll Never Know Unless We Try
 Johan Berggren: Lilyhamericana

Electronica
 Gundelach: My Frail Body
 Lindstrøm & Prins Thomas: III
 Niilas: Also This Will Change
 Fredfades & Jawn Rice: Luv Neva Fades

Folk/traditional music
 Britt Pernille Frøholm: Fokhaugen
 Mads Erik Odde: Logne slåttar
 Ronny Kjøsen: BoneBohem
 Johanne Flottorp/Åsmund Solberg: Heimespel

Hip Hop
 Musti: Qoyskayga
 S1sco: S1sco 2020
 Cezinando: Et godt stup i et grunt vann
 Dutty Dior: Komma, moshpit, status, kaotisk eleganse

Indie/alternative
 Nils Bech: Foolish Heart
 Das Body: Peregrine
 Siv Jakobsen: A Temporary Soothing
 Okay Kaya: Watch This Liquid Pour Itself

Jazz
 Gard Nilssen's Supersonic Orchestra: If You Listen Carefully the Music is Yours
 Møster!: Dust Breathing
 Harald Lassen: Human samling
 Maria Kannegaard Trio: Sand i en vik

Classical
 Arve Tellefsen, Kaare Ørnung: Haijn Kaare Ørnung å Æ
 Sandra Lied Haga: Sandra Lied Haga
 Edward Gardner, Bergen filharmoniske orkester: Benjamin Britten: Peter Grimes
 Eldbjørg Hemsing, Simon Trpčesju: Grieg: The Violin Sonatas

Metal
 Ormskrik: Ormskrik
 Enslaved: Utgard
 Okkultokrati: La Ilden Lyse
 Beaten To Death: Laat maar, ik verhuis naar het bos

Pop
 Sondre Lerche: Patience
 Annie: Dark Hearts
 Emilie Nicolas: Let her Breathe
 SKAAR: The Other Side Of Waiting

Rock
 Motorpsycho: The All Is One
 Daufødt: 1000 Island
 The Good The Bad and The Zugly: Algorithm & Blues
 Undergrünnen: Ein revnande likegyldighet

R and B/Soul
 EHI: Toni Braxton
 Lido: Peder
 Ivan Ave: Double Goodbyes
 Natnael: Mannekeng

Contemporary
 Tøyen Fil og Klafferi: otanisk hage
 Christian Wallumrød Ensemble: Many
 Kim Myhr & Australian Art Orchestra: Vesper
 Det Norske Solistkor: Lament

Viser (Vispop)
 Valkyrien Allstars: Slutte og byne
 Marthe Wang: Bakkekontakt
 Terje Norum og Trond Granlund: Skogslusken
 Stein Torleif Bjella: Øvre-Ål Toneakademi

Open class
 Hedvig Mollestad: Ekhidna
 Stian Westerhus: Redundance
 Mimmi: Semper Eadem
 Jaga Jazzist: Pyramid

Breakthrough of the year & Gramo scholarship
 Musti
 S1sco
 Sebastian Zalo
 Bølgen
 SKAAR
 Ringnes-Ronny

Tonos composer prize
 Henrik Ødegaard: Batitudes
 Daniel Herskedal: Call For Winter
 Andreas Rotevatn: alea iacta est
 Maja S.K. Ratkje: Maja S. K. Ratkje: Works for String Orchestra

Song
 Dagny: "Somebody"
 CLMD & Tungevaag: "DANCE"
 TIX: "Karantene"
 TIX: "Kaller på deg"
 Frida Ånnevik & Chris Holsten: "Hvis verden"
 Julie Bergan & Seeb: "Kiss Somebody"
 Kygo feat. OneRepublic: "Lose Somebody"
 Alan Walker & Ava Max: "Alone, Pt. II"

Songwriter
 Nicolas Pablo Munoz: Wachito Rico
 Kristoffer Cezinando Karlsen: Et godt stup i et grunt vann
 Sondre Lerche: Patience
 Anne Lilia Berge Strand: Dark Hearts

Music video of the year
 Boy Pablo, director: Eivind Landsvik: "Hey girl"
 B-boy Myhre ft. Cezinando, director: Håkon Hoffart: "Gammel person"
 Girl in Red, director: Niels Windfeldt: "Rue"
 Lokoy & Safario, director: Lasse Lokøy, Kacper Tratkowski, Erik Matthew Cannon, Viktor Lier, Samuel Rud Dale: "Both Eyes"

Producer
 Thomas Kongshavn: Thomas Kongshavn
 Matias Tellez: Matias Téllez produsent 2020
 Ole Torjus Hofvind: Ole Torjus 2020
 Lars Horntveth: Pyramid

Lyricist
 Ugbad Yusuf Mustafa: Qoyskayga
 Tuva Livsdatter Syvertsen: Slutte og byne
 Kristoffer Cezinando Karlsen: Et godt stup i et grunt vann
 Sondre Lerche: Patience

Honorary Award
 Mayhem (band)

Spellemann
 TIX (Selected)

References

External links
 Official website

 
Awards established in 1973
1973 establishments in Norway
Norwegian music awards